Willem "Wim" Alfred Udenhout (born 29 September 1937 in Coronie District) was the military-installed Prime Minister of Suriname from February 1984 to July 1986. He had previously been a teacher and, for a time, a Black Power activist. As an academic he had a PhD in English literature from Leiden University. He later served as an ambassador to the United States. He did not favor investigating the military's murder of civilians or of Maroon people. He is most recently the Chairman of the Suriname Conservation Foundation.

References 

|-

1937 births
Living people
Prime Ministers of Suriname
Finance ministers of Suriname
Leiden University alumni
Ambassadors of Suriname to the United States
People from Coronie District